Windwaker is an Australian heavy metal band from Melbourne, Australia, formed in 2014.   After numerous lineup changes, Windwaker consists of lead vocalist Liam Guinane, guitarist Jesse Crofts, bassist Indey Salvestro, DJ Connor Robins, and drummer Chris Lalic.

They have released one studio album, Love Language (2022), and two EPs, Fade (2017), and Empire (2019).

History

Early years and Fade (2014–2018) 
Windwaker, named after the Legend of Zelda game of the same name, was formed in Wagga Wagga, New South Wales in late-2014. The founding lineup featured vocalist Will King, bassist Indey Salvestro, drummer Chris Lalic and guitarists Mark Mcghie and Will Eggleton.

In April 2015, Windwaker relocated from Wagga Wagga, New South Wales to Melbourne, Victoria and began performing and recording new material. Their debut single "The Charade", featuring Zach Britt of Dream On, Dreamer, was released on 15 September.

Windwaker's next single "Castaway" was released on 2 November 2016, and was later included on their debut EP.

The band began performing with Liam Guinane, who unofficially acted as both a live and studio guitarist after the departure of Mcghie, while guitarist Chris Moohan began playing with the group after the departure of Eggleton. Windwaker's debut EP Fade was released on 31 May 2017. The EP was produced, mixed and mastered by Sonny Truelove at STL Studios in Sydney, Australia.

On 15 January 2018, Windwaker introduced guitarist Jesse Crofts as an official member. Two days later, Guinane was officially introduced as the fifth member of the band. On April 2, the band released the single "New Infinite", the first track to feature Guinane and Crofts. The band made their first festival appearance at BIGSOUND Festival in Brisbane, Queensland in September.

Empire and Guinane's departure (2019–2020) 
In early-2019, the hashtag #TheSitch frequently began to appear across social media forums in Australia. On 1 February 2019, Windwaker released the single "The Sitch" with an accompanying music video and announced pre-orders for their sophomore EP Empire. The band released the second single of the release, "My Empire", on March 5 with an accompanying music video. The self-produced EP was mixed, mastered and engineered by drummer Chris Lalic, while additional engineering was provided by guitarist Liam Guinane and Declan White. Former-vocalist Will King commented about the release: "Coming out of our last record, a record deeply rooted in post-adolescent feelings of pain and loneliness, as a band, it’s safe to say that we all had this strong desire to redeem ourselves of those sole qualities. I think we have always feared trapping ourselves in a box, kept in by one-dimensional expectations, and we are very conscious of not allowing that influence to hinder our creativity. We are absolutely not a band who is going to sit around all day writing the same songs over and over again." On 10 March, Windwaker played their first large festival at Download Festival Melbourne, after winning a national triple j Unearthed competition. Their second EP, Empire was released on March 22, with a limited physical release following in June. All of the shows for the Empire tour sold out. The band subsequently signed with New World Artists for bookings. In July Windwaker joined Beartooth on their Disease Tour as support, alongside Thornhill. Windwaker announced that Guinane was unable to attend the tour due to personal obligations, so former-Weighbridge vocalist/guitarist Sean Ross filled in. They also stated their plan to cover Silverchair's hit "Freak" on the tour. On September 9, Guinane  announced he would be leaving Windwaker to focus on his other band Reside. He played at Windwaker's performances at Good Things in December and Unify Festival in January 2020 before departing.

Love Language and King's departure (2020–present)
On 30 December 2020, Windwaker announced their plans to release their debut studio album Love Language with a date yet to be revealed.

On 17 December 2021, they made their Fearless Records debut with the single "Toxic", a cover of the Britney Spears' single. Windwaker also announced The Beautiful Tour with dates in early-March.

On 11 February 2022, Windwaker released the single "Beautiful" with an accompanying music video. Their debut studio album Love Language had its release date of 6 May announced also. On 4 March, they released the second single off their debut album, "Lucy" and its music video, the track was loosely inspired by psychedelic experiences. On March 25, their third single "Glow" was released alongside a music video. The fourth and final single of the album, "Superstitious Fantasy" was released in 15 April with its music video. The full album was then released on 6 May 2022. On 15 September, the band announced on social media that Will King had departed from the band to focus on studying Psychology, and former guitarist and backing vocalist Liam Guinane had returned to fulfill lead vocal duties. After performing as a session member for 2022, Connor Robins was officially added to the band on keyboards and later featured on the band's follow-up single "Left in the Dark" released on 11 November with an accompanying music video.

Members 

Current
 Liam Guinane – lead vocals ; rhythm guitar, backup vocals ; programming 
 Jesse Crofts – lead guitar 
 Indey Salvestro – bass 
 Chris Lalic – drums ; programming 
 Connor Robins – DJ 

Former
 Will King – lead vocals 
 Mark Mcghie – lead guitar 
 Will Eggleton – rhythm guitar 
 Chris Moohan – lead guitar 
 Jesse Holt – rhythm guitar 

Timeline

Discography

Studio albums

Extended plays

Singles

Music videos

Notes

References 

2015 establishments in Australia
Australian metalcore musical groups
Musical groups established in 2014
Musical groups from Melbourne
Musical trios
Musical quintets
Musical quartets